The Electoral district of Stanley Boroughs was an electorate of the New South Wales Legislative Council at a time when some of its members were elected and the balance were appointed by the Governor. It was a new electorate created in 1851 by the expansion of the Legislative Council to 54 members, with 18 to be appointed and 36 elected. 
The previous district of Counties of Gloucester, Macquarie, and Stanley was split into the districts of Gloucester & Macquarie, Stanley and Stanley Boroughs. The district included North Brisbane, South Brisbane, Kangaroo Point and Ipswich.

In 1856 the unicameral Legislative Council was abolished and replaced with an elected Legislative Assembly and an appointed Legislative Council. The district was represented by the Legislative Assembly electorate of Stanley Boroughs.

Members

John Richardson went on to represent Stanley Boroughs in the Legislative Assembly from 1856.

Election results

1851

1853
Richard Jones died in November 1852.

1855
Henry Russell resigned in August 1855 to travel to England.

See also
Members of the New South Wales Legislative Council, 1851-1856

References

Former electoral districts of New South Wales Legislative Council
Electoral districts of New South Wales in the area of Queensland
1851 establishments in Australia
1856 disestablishments in Australia